Little Catoctin Creek  is an  tributary of the Potomac River in Frederick County, Maryland. The creek starts south of Burkittsville and flows to the southeast, passing north of Brunswick before emptying into the Potomac west of Lander.

The name is also used for two tributaries of Catoctin Creek near Myersville.

References

Rivers of Frederick County, Maryland
Rivers of Maryland
Tributaries of the Potomac River